SmartLink was the trademark name for a proprietary technology by Sharp Corporation for wireless transmission of television signals. The system involved two devices, each a little bit bigger than a paperback book:  one attached to a television screen and the other was hooked up to a TV tuner, DVD player, or any playback device.

The SmartLink system was to go on sale in Japan on August 3, 2001, at a list price of $400 ( present day US dollars).

SmartLink was incorporated into Sharp's Wireless AQUOS television, model LC-15L1U-S.

References 

Television technology